The Pyana is a river in Nizhny Novgorod Oblast and the Republic of Mordovia, Russia. It is a left tributary of the Sura.

History and etymology
Pyana translates from Russian into drunken. The original name of the river was likely Piana, and, like many other old Russian geographical names, might be of Uralic origin (compare Finnish pieni meaning small). The most likely reason for the transformation of Piana to Pyana was the Battle on Pyana River. The battle was fought on 2 August 1377 between the Blue Horde Khan Arapsha (Arab-Shah Muzaffar) and joint Russian troops under Knyaz Ivan Dmitriyevich. Awaiting the battle, the Russian Army lost discipline with drunkenness being a norm. They were unexpectedly attacked from all sides and crushed by the Mongols, forcing retreat to and across the Pyana. Many soldiers, and the Knyaz himself, drowned while crossing it. This explanation is further supported by the original text of the chronicles of the battle, where the writer first calls the river Piana, then notes the ironical similarity of the words piana and pyana (in a sense of drunkenness) and further uses Pyana as the river name.

Geography and hydrology
It freezes around November and thaws in April. The average discharge 65 km from its mouth is 25 m³/s and it can vary between 10 and 1,500 m³/s. River banks contain numerous karst caves. Pyana is remarkable by its shape: it runs to the north-west and then turns 180° south-east making a nearly closed loop (see map) before turning north and merging with the Sura.

Human activities
The towns of Perevoz and Sergach are located on the Pyana. The river is navigable in its lower reaches. On the river banks there is Ichalkovsky Natural Reserve of 936 ha area which is protected by the state since 1963. There is a hydroelectric station near the village of Ichalkovo with the annual production of 600 MW. Its construction was started after World War II, but completed only in the 1990s.

References

Rivers of Mordovia
Rivers of Nizhny Novgorod Oblast